The Eleventh Commandment is a novel by Jeffrey Archer, first published in 1998. The title refers to the rule Thou Shalt Not Get Caught.

Plot summary 

The chief of the CIA, Helen Dexter, decides, on her own, to order the murder of political figures of other nations on the basis of their views on the United States. The book starts with the murder of a candidate for the Colombian presidency. During this time, Helen finds out that she would be fired if she is found out to be ordering assassinations on several nations. To cover up her work she plans to have her chief assassin, Connor Fitzgerald, eliminated. The CIA rejects Connor's resignation and asks him to go on a final mission to assassinate a candidate for the Russian presidency. While attending a speech, Connor is arrested and placed in a Russian jail to be executed. A friend of his arrives in time and tries to rescue him by making a bargain with the Russian Mafia. In exchange for Fitzgerald to be replaced with his friend, Fitzgerald will have to assassinate the Russian president. Fitzgerald fails in the attempt and "dies." Later on he returns home with the name of a professor and he has lost his arm.

External links 
 

1998 British novels
Novels by Jeffrey Archer
HarperCollins books